Nephopterix capnoessa is a species of snout moth in the genus Nephopterix. It was described by Alfred Jefferis Turner in 1904 and is known from Australia, including New South Wales.

References

Moths described in 1904
Phycitini